Nahr-e Mosallam is a village in Buzi Rural District, in the Central District of Shadegan County, Khuzestan Province, Iran. At the 2006 census, its population was 1,521, in 280 families.

References 

Populated places in Shadegan County